Brca or BRCA may refer to:

 Brca (Bar Municipality), a village in Macedonia
BRCA mutation, mutations in two genes which produce a hereditary breast-ovarian cancer syndrome
BRCA1, the first of these genes to be discovered
BRCA2, the second of these genes to be discovered
British Radio Car Association, a British radio controlled car racing organisation
Brotherhood Railway Carmen of America, a defunct American trade union
Bureau Central de Renseignements et d'Action, the Free French intelligence agency during World War II